San Juan de Urabá is a town and municipality in the Colombian department of Antioquia.

Climate
San Juan de Urabá has a tropical monsoon climate (Köppen Am) with moderate to little rainfall from December to March and heavy rainfall from April to November.

References
 El Colombiano newspaper; San Juan beberá de mejores fuentes

Municipalities of Antioquia Department